Barren Ground, Barren Grounds or Barren-ground may refer to:
 Barren Grounds, a Canadian term for tundra
 Barren Ground (novel), 1925 novel by Ellen Glasgow
 "Barren Ground" (song), a 1990 song by Bruce Hornsby
 Barren ground shrew (Sorex ugyunak), small shrew found in Canada and Alaska
 Barren Ground, Saint Helena, settlement on Saint Helena, South Atlantic Ocean
 Barren-ground caribou (Rangifer tarandus groenlandicus), subspecies of caribou found in Canada and Greenland
 Barren Grounds Nature Reserve, New South Wales, Australia
 Barren Grounds Bird Observatory